The 2009 W-League grand final was the grand final of the second season of the Australian W-League football (soccer) competition. It was contested between premiers Sydney FC and third-placed Brisbane Roar at Toyota Stadium in Sydney on Saturday, 19 December 2009. Sydney FC became the second W-League champions after defeating the Brisbane Roar 3–2.

Match details

See also
List of W-League champions

References

External links

grand final
Soccer in Sydney
A-League Women Grand Finals